Lucy Geneviève Teresa Ward, Countess de Guerbel, DBE (27 March 1837 – 18 August 1922), also known as Countess de Guerbel and, sometimes, albeit inaccurately, as Dame Geneviève Ward, was a United Kingdom-based American-born Russian soprano and actress. She was appointed Honorary Dame Commander of the Order of the British Empire on her 84th birthday in 1921.

Life and career
Ward was born in New York City to Colonel Samuel Ward, and his wife, Lucy. She was the granddaughter of Gideon Lee, a former mayor of New York City. At the age of three she accompanied her parents to Europe. She began to display a preference for the arts, and devoted herself by turns to the study of painting, sculpture, and music. By degrees, music absorbed her entirely, and her proficiency on the piano attracted attention. 

On 10 November 1856, at age 19, she married a Russian count, Constantine de Guerbel. After a few years' stay in Europe, the family returned to New York, and soon afterward made the acquaintance of Henriette Sontag, who encouraged Ward to study singing. When the Ward family returned to Europe, Sontag gave Geneviève a letter of introduction to the composer Rossini. In 1862, after Ward's last role in La Traviata, she retired due to vocal difficulties. Ward later became a stage actress, noted for dramatic roles. She toured Australia as an actress.

Later years
She published a volume of reminiscences, Before and Behind the Curtain in 1918.

Death
Geneviève Ward, Countess de Guerbel, died of heart disease at her home in Hampstead on 18 August 1922, aged 85.

References

External links
The Illustrated Sporting & Dramatic News Saturday April 10, 1880

1837 births
1922 deaths
Former United States citizens
Russian emigrants to the United Kingdom
Russian people of American descent
Russian stage actresses
Russian opera singers
Singers awarded knighthoods
Singers from New York City
Honorary Dames Commander of the Order of the British Empire
Actresses awarded damehoods
19th-century American singers
19th-century American women singers